Dr. Michael Heeley Wenning (July 5, 1935 – June 28, 2011) was a South African-born American Presbyterian minister. He served as the senior pastor at the Bel Air Presbyterian Church from 1995 to 2001. He gained national prominence when conducting President Ronald Reagan's state funeral.

Early life
Wenning was born in Cape Town. He was educated at Texas Christian University (Master of Divinity) in Fort Worth, Texas and New York University (master's in both psychology and counseling).

Career
From 1969 to 1977, he was pastor of a Presbyterian church in Durban, South Africa. In 1977 he returned to the United States where he worked for the next three decades as a pastor in various Presbyterian Church (U.S.A.) congregations. He served as the senior pastor at the Pleasant Hills Community Presbyterian Church in Pleasant Hills, Pennsylvania more than nine years, between January 1977 and August 1986.

Reagan funeral

He was notably the senior pastor at Bel Air Presbyterian Church from 1995 to 2001. There he developed a close relationship with church members Ronald and Nancy Reagan. He notably conducted President Reagan's interment service on June 7, 2004 following the latter's death and state funeral.

Death
Wenning died in 2011, just one week before his 76th birthday, at his home in Mission Viejo, California from kidney failure resulting from leukemia. He is survived by his wife Freda and his two daughters.

References

External links

 Michael Wenning - November 2010 - YouTube
 

1935 births
2011 deaths
American Presbyterian ministers
New York University alumni
People from Cape Town
Texas Christian University alumni
Presbyterian Church (USA) teaching elders
South African emigrants to the United States
Deaths from kidney failure
Deaths from leukemia
Deaths from cancer in California